Enfield County is a girls' comprehensive school which was once created as Enfield Chace School in 1967, following the amalgamation of Enfield County School, which had been a girls' grammar school, with Chace Girls School, a secondary modern school. The amalgamated school readopted the name Enfield County School in 1987.

In 2018 the School adopted the name Enfield County School for Girls.

Admissions
It is situated directly in the middle of Enfield, slightly to the north of the town centre, equidistant between the two railway stations, near St Andrew's Enfield.

History

Former schools
The original Enfield County School had been opened in 1909, becoming Enfield County Grammar School for Girls, which had around 850 girls. It was administered by Middlesex County Council Education Committee (Borough of Enfield). Chace Girls School had been formed in 1962 as a girls' secondary modern school from the senior girls department at Lavender School. Both were well-established girls' schools, each with a long tradition of high achievement and academic excellence, according to the current Headteacher, Ms. J. Gumbrell.

Comprehensive
It became the comprehensive girls' Enfield Chace School in 1967, changing to its current name in 1987. In 2005 the school was designated a specialist school for languages.

Former teachers
 Jill Paton Walsh (nee Bliss) CBE, author (taught English from 1959 to 1962 at the grammar school)

Campus
The buildings are a blend of solid Edwardian, post war and 1990s "design-build". The lower school in Rosemary Avenue, which was the former Chace Girls School, houses years 7, 8 and 9; at fourteen years of age students transfer to the upper school in Holly Walk (former grammar school), about a mile away in the centre of the old town of Enfield, London. After Enfield Court in Baker Street was purchased to accommodate the lower school of Enfield Grammar School in 1942, the first year pupils of the previous girls' grammar school, Enfield County School, shared it with the first year pupils of Enfield Grammar for a few years.

Traditions
At first, the school motto, which was incorporated in the school badge, was Onward Ever, which had previously been the motto of the grammar school in the amalgamation. This was later changed to Learning: it's at the heart of everything we do.

Notable former pupils

Enfield County School
 Cheyenne Maya Carty, Model
 Keisha White, singer
 Jaime Winstone, actress
 Lois Winstone, actress
 Ash Sarkar, journalist and activist 
 Lola Olufemi, writer
 Jasmine Blackborow, actress and voiceover artist

Enfield County Grammar School for Girls
 Joyce Anelay, Baroness Anelay of St Johns (née Clarke), Conservative politician, former shadow Chief Whip
 Olive Banks (née Davies), historian of feminism
 Geraldine McCaughrean, author
 Dame Helen Metcalf (née Pitt), former headteacher from 1998 to 2001 of Chiswick Community School, and former Islington Labour councillor
 Frances Perry (née Everett) MBE, horticulture author and broadcaster, and wife of Roy Hay (horticulturist)
 Nancy Tait, health campaigner
 Brenda Bruce actress

See also
 Chace Community School, coeducational (former boys' - Chace School) school in Enfield on Churchbury Lane
 Enfield Grammar School, a school that merged with Chace Boys' School.

References

Further reading
Onward ever: the story of Enfield County School for Girls, 1909-1967 by Joan Hinchcliffe Hart, 1999

External links
 Enfield County School official site
 A detailed history of Education in Enfield at British History Online
 Moving Here - The immigration story of Grete Rudkin (born Glauber), who attended Enfield County School

Enfield, London
Secondary schools in the London Borough of Enfield
Educational institutions established in 1967
1967 establishments in England
Girls' schools in London
Community schools in the London Borough of Enfield